Giorgos Lavaridis (born in 1947) is a Greek former professional footballer who played as a midfielder.

Club career
Lavaridis started playing football in 1961 at Galatasaray, pushed by his father, "Giakis", at the age 14. He was given the nickname "Baby" by the local Greeks who watched him play in Istanbul, due to his young age. In 1964, Lavaridis moved to Greece and joined the academies of AEK Athens. He was promoted to the first team in 1968 under Branko Stanković. With AEK he reaced to the quarter-finals of the European Cup in 1969. In 1971 he was one of the key players in winning the championship. He left AEK in 1975 when the then president of the club, Loukas Barlos decided to proceed with a renewal in the roster and then played in Panserraikos for 2 years before retiring as a footballer.

International career
Lavaridis was a member of Greece U21, which in 1971 won the Balkan Youth Championship,

Personal life
Lavaridis is married with two children. He was rumored to be ordained a Greek Orthodox priest, but this was disputed. On 19 July 2022 he visited the offices of AEK Athens accompanied by his wife and daughter and donated to their new Museum his jersey from the early 70's and a photo frame with a photo of him in action from the friendly match against Nacional on 22 August 1973.

Honours

AEK Athens
Alpha Ethniki: 1970–71

Greece U21
Balkan Youth Championship: 1971

References

1947 births
Living people
Greek footballers
Association football midfielders
AEK Athens F.C. players
Panserraikos F.C. players
Footballers from Istanbul
Constantinopolitan Greeks